The Arco Baptist Community Church is a church building located in Arco, Idaho listed on the National Register of Historic Places.  Also known as Arco Baptist Church, it was completed in 1929 and was listed on the National Register in 2001.

It is a two-story building which was built to plans provided by the American Baptist Home Mission Society. Its Romanesque Revival style is disguised by use of rounded local fieldstone instead of square-cut ashlar stone.

See also

 List of National Historic Landmarks in Idaho
 National Register of Historic Places listings in Butte County, Idaho

References

Baptist churches in Idaho
Buildings and structures in Butte County, Idaho
Churches on the National Register of Historic Places in Idaho
Cobblestone architecture
National Register of Historic Places in Butte County, Idaho
Romanesque Revival church buildings in Idaho